Taekwondo competitions at the 2021 Junior Pan American Games in Cali, Colombia, were held at the Hockey Miguel Calero Arena between November 26 and 27, 2021.

8 medal events were contested (four per gender).

Medal table

Medalists

Men

Women

References

External links
Taekwondo at the 2021 Junior Pan American Games

Junior Pan American Games
Events at the 2021 Junior Pan American Games
Qualification tournaments for the 2023 Pan American Games